The Chester Heights Camp Meeting Historic District is a historic Methodist camp meeting and national historic district located in Chester Heights, Delaware County, Pennsylvania. The district includes 101 contributing buildings, which were designed in the vernacular camp meeting style of architecture; additional notable examples of the Gothic Revival and Queen Anne styles also are present here. Public buildings include the contributing Tabernacle (1878), Dining Hall (1900), Youth Tabernacle (1909, and dormitory. Most of the contributing buildings are cottages, which were built roughly between 1876 and 1920.

In two separate incidents in 2011 and early 2012, the Tabernacle and multiple cottages were burned in arson incidents. In 2016 part of the property was sold to be developed as an apartment complex.

History
In 1872, an association of Methodists purchased land and incorporated under the title Chester-Heights Camp-Meeting Association.

Placement of this district on the National Register of Historic Places
The NRHP nomination application for the Chester Heights Camp Meeting Historic District was formally reviewed by Pennsylvania's Historic Preservation Board at its March 13, 2001 meeting at 9:45 a.m. at the State Museum in Harrisburg. Also considered for NRHP status at this time were the: Protection of the Flag Monument in Athens, Pennsylvania; Normandy Farm, George K. Heller School, and Upper Roxborough Historic District in Montgomery County; Awbury Historic District and Harris/Laird, Schober & Company Building in Philadelphia; Michael Derstine Farmstead in Bucks County; John Nicholas and Elizabeth Moyer House in Berks County; William Shelly School and Annex in York County; and the Zeta Psi Fraternity House in Northampton County.

The Chester Heights Camp Meeting Historic District was then officially added to the National Register of Historic Places later in 2001.

Later history
In 2011 and early 2012, the Tabernacle and multiple cottages were burned in two separate arson incidents. In 2016 part of the property was sold to be developed as an apartment complex.

References

External links
Chester Heights Campmeeting Association website

Gothic Revival architecture in Pennsylvania
Queen Anne architecture in Pennsylvania
Religious buildings and structures completed in 1878
Historic districts in Delaware County, Pennsylvania
Historic districts on the National Register of Historic Places in Pennsylvania
National Register of Historic Places in Delaware County, Pennsylvania
Camp meeting grounds
Methodism in Pennsylvania